Little Chishill is a village and former civil parish, now in the parish of Great and Little Chishill, in the South Cambridgeshire district, in the county of Cambridgeshire, England. In 1961 the parish had a population of 86. On 1 April 1968 the parish was abolished to form "Great and Little Chishill".

Parish church
The Church of England parish church of Saint Nicholas is built of flint with limestone and clunch dressings. Its chancel is 12th-century and was extended in the 13th century. The nave was rebuilt in the 14th century, and the west tower and south porch are late 14th-century. New windows were inserted in the nave in the 15th century, and were replaced in the 19th century. The east window of the chancel and the belfry openings of the west tower are 16th-century. The church is a Grade II* listed building.

The parish's first recorded vicar was John Martyn in 1333.

See also
The Hundred Parishes

References

Bibliography

External links

Great & Little Chishill

Villages in Cambridgeshire
Former civil parishes in Cambridgeshire
South Cambridgeshire District